Night Visions is an American series of horror fiction anthologies published 1984–1991 by Dark Harvest of Arlington Heights, Illinois, United States. The science fiction bibliographer and scholar Neil Barron wrote that Night Visions is an important series insofar as many of the stories it published represented some of the best short fiction produced by its writers, and that "it is a cornerstone of any modern horror library."

Night Visions 1 Alan Ryan 1984
Night Visions 2 Charles L. Grant 1985
Night Visions 3 George R. R. Martin
Night Visions 4 by Paul Mikol, Anon.
Night Visions 5 Paul J. Mikol, republished as Dark Visions with three short stories by Stephen King, three by Dan Simmons, and one by George R. R. Martin.
Night Visions 6 by Paul J. Mikol
Night Visions VII Stanley Wiater
Night Visions 8 ed. Anon., Arlington Heights, IL: Dark Harvest, 1991
Night Visions 9 ed. Anon., Arlington Heights, IL: Dark Harvest, 1991
Night Visions : Dead Image 1987
Night Visions : In the Blood 1988

References

Horror anthologies
Book series introduced in 1984